Fritz Baumgarten (21 December 1886 – 17 May 1961) was a German footballer.

He played as a goalkeeper for the Berlin club BFC Germania. On 5 April 1908, in Basel, Switzerland Baumgarten was part of the national side in Germany's first ever international match which they lost 5–3 to the Swiss. This was his only appearance for the national team.

References

1886 births
1961 deaths
German footballers
BFC Germania 1888 players
Germany international footballers
Association football goalkeepers
German footballers needing infoboxes